George Hillyard Swinstead (1860-1926) was a British artist associated with the Suffolk school.

References

External links 

George Hillyard Swinstead | artnet

1860 births
1926 deaths
British artists